Colvin Taluqdars' College is a private school located in Lucknow, India.

References

 

Boarding schools in Uttar Pradesh
Private schools in Lucknow
Educational institutions established in 1891
1891 establishments in India